Big Hits and Nasty Cuts: The Best of Twisted Sister is a greatest hits compilation by American heavy metal band, Twisted Sister. It was released in 1992 by Atlantic Recording Corporation for the United States and by WEA International Inc. for the rest of the world. The track list consists solely of songs from their first three albums, omitting any material from Come Out and Play and Love Is for Suckers, except outside of the United States where "Bad Boys of Rock 'n' Roll" was replaced with "Be Chrool to Your Scuel" from Come Out and Play.

The album received a Parental Advisory sticker for the live tracks, which contain some profanity.

Track listing
 "We're Not Gonna Take It" - 3:39
 "I Wanna Rock" - 3:03
 "I Am (I'm Me)" - 3:35
 "The Price" - 3:49
 "You Can't Stop Rock 'n' Roll" - 4:42
 "The Kids Are Back" - 3:17
 "Shoot 'Em Down" - 3:54
 "Under the Blade" - 4:40
 "I'll Never Grow Up, Now!" - 4:08
 "Bad Boys (Of Rock 'n' Roll)" - 3:19
 "What You Don't Know (Sure Can Hurt You)" (live) - 5:09
 "Destroyer" (live) - 4:37
 "Tear It Loose" (live) - 3:05
 "Run for Your Life" (live) - 3:38 (US version only)
 "It's Only Rock 'n' Roll" (live) - 10:12
 "Let the Good Times Roll" / "Feel So Fine" (live) - 4:15

Credits

Twisted Sister
Dee Snider - lead vocals
Eddie "Fingers" Ojeda - lead & rhythm guitars
Jay Jay French - rhythm & lead guitars
Mark "The Animal" Mendoza - bass
A. J. Pero - drums

References

Twisted Sister albums
Albums produced by Tom Werman
1992 compilation albums
Atlantic Records compilation albums